Greenomyia is a genus of flies belonging to the family Mycetophilidae.

The species of this genus are found in Europe and Northern America.

Species:
 Greenomyia baikalica Zaitzev, 1994 
 Greenomyia borealis (Winnertz, 1863)

References

Mycetophilidae